The year 1867 in architecture involved some significant architectural events and new buildings.

Events
 May 12 – Construction work begins on Toluca Cathedral in Mexico.
 May 20 – Queen Victoria lays the foundation stone for the Royal Albert Hall in London, designed by Captain Francis Fowke and Colonel H. Y. Darracott Scott.
 Joseph Monier patents reinforced concrete.
 Ildefons Cerdà publishes Teoría General de la Urbanización ("General Theory of Urbanization").
 The United States Congress directs the United States Army Corps of Engineers to begin improvements on the Navigation Structures at Frankfort Harbor, Michigan.

Buildings and structures

Buildings opened
 January 1 – The John A. Roebling Suspension Bridge in Cincinnati, Ohio and Covington, Kentucky, United States
 May 11 – St Nedelya Church, Sofia, Bulgaria (rebuilt)
 July 30 – Kvæfjord Church, Norway, designed by Jacob Wilhelm Nordan
 July 31 – St Giles Church, Willenhall, England (consecrated)
 September 27 – Zagreb Synagogue (consecrated)

Buildings completed
 Russian-American Building No. 29, Sitka, Alaska
 Grande halle de la Villette (abattoir), Paris, France, designed by Jules de Mérindol and Louis-Adolphe Janvier

Awards
 RIBA Royal Gold Medal – Charles Texier.
 Grand Prix de Rome, architecture – Émile Bénard.

Births

 February 2 - Theodate Pope Riddle, American architect (died 1946)
 March 10 – Hector Guimard, French Art Nouveau architect (died 1942)
 April 27 – Charles Nicholson, English ecclesiastical architect (died 1949)
 June 8 – Frank Lloyd Wright, American architect, interior designer, writer and educator (died 1959)
 June 22 – John A. Pearson, English-born Canadian architect (died 1940)
 August 15 - Henry Hornbostel, American architect and academic (died 1967)
 October 11 – Francis Rattenbury, English-born Canadian architect (murdered 1935)
 October 17 – Josep Puig i Cadafalch, Catalan Spanish Modernista architect (died 1956)
 November 24 – Detmar Blow, English Arts and Crafts architect (died 1939)

Deaths

 March 6 – József Hild, Hungarian architect (born 1789)
 March 25 – Jakob Ignaz Hittorff, Franco-German architect, who supervised changes at Palais Beauharnais in Paris (born 1792)
 April 18 – Robert Smirke, English Greek Revival architect (born 1780)

References

Architecture
Years in architecture
19th-century architecture